The 2010 Big Ten Conference baseball tournament was held at Huntington Park in Columbus, Ohio, from May 23 through 26.  won their ninth tournament championship and earned the Big Ten Conference's automatic bid to the 2010 NCAA Division I baseball tournament.

Regular season results 
The top six teams (based on conference results) from the conference earn invites to the tournament.

Format 
The 2010 tournament was a 6-team double-elimination tournament. The top two seeds received a single bye into the semifinals (2nd Round). The 1 seed played the lowest seeded Round 1 winner, while the 2 seed played the highest seeded Round 1 winner.

Bracket

References 

Tournament
Big Ten baseball tournament
Big Ten Baseball Tournament
Big Ten baseball tournament